Budějovická is a Prague Metro station on Line C, located in Krč, Prague 4. It was opened on 9 May 1974 with the first section of Prague Metro, between Sokolovská and Kačerov.

The station has two exits, one leading to Olbrachtová street and the other to Antala Staška street. They are connected by a walkway under the DBK shopping centre.

References

External links 

 Gallery

Prague Metro stations
Railway stations opened in 1974
1974 establishments in Czechoslovakia
Railway stations in the Czech Republic opened in the 20th century